Wrestling at the 2017 Summer Deaflympics took place at the Kavak Sports Hall.

Medal summary

Medalists

Men's freestyle

Men's Greco-Roman

References

External links
 Freestyle Wrestling
 Greco-Roman Wrestling

2017 Summer Deaflympics
2017 in sport wrestling
International wrestling competitions hosted by Turkey